Annick Thoumazeau (born in Fréjus in 1960) is a French singer. She represented France in the 1984 Eurovision Song Contest, with the song "Autant d'amoureux que d'étoiles" (English translation: "As Many Lovers As Stars").

Thoumazeau performed third on the night, before Spain, and after Luxembourg. She placed eighth out of nineteen entries, receiving a total of 61 points.

Under the pen name Année Leed, Thoumazeau wrote the lyrics to the musical Virulla, which was staged in Disneyland Paris and Le Théâtre du gymnase, Paris in the 2000s.

References

1960 births
Living people
People from Fréjus
French women singers
Eurovision Song Contest entrants for France
Eurovision Song Contest entrants of 1984